Equipment Support, sometimes abbreviated as ES or Equip Spt, is a term used to describe maintenance and supply duties of certain Army units in the Western World.  The term is sometimes also described as 'materiel', however this term typically refers to the supply of equipment, rather than the actual practice of providing support for certain items.

Uses

United Kingdom 
In the British Army, the term is used to describe those units and duties where maintenance units provide support to certain vehicles and equipment.  In addition, the term is sometimes used in the following terms "... responsible for maintenance and repairing the Army's equipment'.

Under British Army doctrine, equipment support is defined as follows:

See also 

 Military logistics
 Military acquisition
 Military supply-chain management

Footnotes

References 

 

Military terminology
Military